Child marriage in Mauritania: in 2017 in Mauritania, 37% of girls are married off before they are 18 years old; 14% are married before they turn 15. Mauritania is the 19th highest nation in the world for child marriage.

A third of women in Mauritania marry early.

Age at first marriage for women in Mauritania in 2016 
Age at first marriage for women in Mauritania in 2016:

See also 
 Polygamy in Mauritania

References 

Mauritania
Childhood in Africa
Marriage in Mauritania